The Mysterious Mr. Nicholson is a 1947 British crime film directed by Oswald Mitchell and starring Anthony Hulme, Lesley Osmond and Frank Hawkins. The plot concerns a valuable inheritance, murder, confusions of identity, and a mysterious crime boss.

Synopsis

A solicitor's secretary is taking a will to a client to be altered. Nearing the address, she bumps into a stranger and after finds a body (who turns out to be the client) lying murdered. The police find a note pinned to the dead man signed by a "V.L.S.". Mr Nicholson (V.L.S.) is approached by the police and he takes up the case.

Cast
 Anthony Hulme - Nicholson / Raeburn
 Lesley Osmond - Peggy Dundas
 Frank Hawkins - Inspector Morley
 Andrew Laurence - Waring
 Douglas Stewart - Seymour
 George Bishop - Mr Browne
 Josie Bradley - Freda
 Ivy Collins - Mrs Barnes

Notes

References

External links
 

1947 films
Films directed by Oswald Mitchell
1947 crime films
British crime films
British black-and-white films
1940s English-language films
1940s British films